Beatrice Matumbo Shellukindo (born 22 August 1958) is a Tanzanian CCM politician and Member of Parliament for Kilindi constituency since 2005.

References

1958 births
Living people
Chama Cha Mapinduzi MPs
Tanzanian MPs 2010–2015
Ashira Secondary School alumni
Sofia University alumni